Mocatta is a Sephardic Anglo-Jewish surname. Notable people with the name include:

Surname 
 Alan Mocatta (1907–1990), British judge and a leader of the Spanish and Portuguese Jews of Britain
 David Mocatta (1806–1882), British architect
 Elias Mocatta (1798–1881), British merchant and financier, significant in the early credit history of Venezuela and other South American countries
 Frederick David Mocatta (1828–1905), British financier and philanthropist

See also

 Mocatta family
 ScotiaMocatta

Jewish surnames